Edmonton Northwest was a federal electoral district in Alberta, Canada, that was represented in the House of Commons of Canada from 1988 to 1997.

It was created in 1987 from parts of Edmonton East, Edmonton North, Edmonton West and Pembina ridings. It was abolished in 1996 when it was redistributed into Edmonton West and Yellowhead ridings.

It consisted of the northwest part of the city of Edmonton, Alberta.

Members of Parliament

Election results

|-

See also 

 List of Canadian federal electoral districts
 Past Canadian electoral districts

External links

Former federal electoral districts of Alberta